General George Patton Museum of Leadership, Fort Knox, Kentucky
General George S. Patton Memorial Museum, Chiriaco Summit, California